Polina Miller (born November 23, 1988 in Saint Petersburg) is a Russian gymnast. She was a member of a team which came 3rd in the 2006 European Women's Championships as well as the 2006 World Gymnastics Championships as part of the team. At the 2005 World Gymnastics Championships she was a finalist in the uneven bars final and ended up in 6th place (9.462).

Competitive history

References

External links
 Lady in Waiting

1988 births
Living people
Russian female artistic gymnasts
Medalists at the World Artistic Gymnastics Championships
Gymnasts from Saint Petersburg